"It's You" is the thirteenth single by Japanese rock duo Love Psychedelico. It was released on August 10, 2011.

Background 

"It's You" is Love Psychedelico's first original single in five years, since "Aha! (All We Want)" (2006). The song was written for the second season of the Aya Ueto-led police procedural drama Zettai Reido, for which it serves as main theme. A cover of the Eric Clapton song "Lay Down Sally," was recorded for the single and included as a B-side. The limited edition of the single, titled "It's You: Zettai Reido Complete Edition" includes both the title track and B-side, the first season's main theme, "Dry Town (Theme of Zero)," and "Shadow Behind," the opening theme for both seasons. "It's You" was digitally released in ringtone format on July 12, 2011, the premiere date of Zettai Reido: Tokushū Hanzai Sennyū Sōsa.

Composition 
In a press release, Kumi commented, "I am happy to have been asked to partake in this project once again. This time around we wrote the song after having talked about the concept and visuals of the show. It felt like a genuine collaboration. We recorded this song with a string orchestra, which is a little something different from us to look forward to." "From our talks with the producer, we determined that "hope" was the keyword for the concept of the drama [...] 'It's You' turned out to be a rooter's song not only for the drama's protagonist, but for all the people in Japan," added Naoki.

The show's producer, Hiroaki Narikawa, also issued a comment on their ongoing collaboration:

Chart performance 
"It's You" debuted at number 26 on the Oricon Daily Singles Chart on August 9, 2011. It peaked at number 34 on the Oricon Weekly Singles chart with 3,120 copies sold in its first week. The single has charted for four weeks, selling 6,156 copies in total.

Track listing

Charts

References

External links 

2011 singles
Japanese television drama theme songs